Leonson Edward Jeffrey Lewis (born 30 December 1966 in Port of Spain) is a Trinidad and Tobago retired footballer who played as a striker.

External links

Trinidad and Tobago – Record International Players; at RSSSF

1966 births
Living people
Sportspeople from Port of Spain
Trinidad and Tobago footballers
Association football forwards
TT Pro League players
W Connection F.C. players
Portmore United F.C. players
Primeira Liga players
Liga Portugal 2 players
Associação Académica de Coimbra – O.A.F. players
F.C. Felgueiras players
Boavista F.C. players
G.D. Chaves players
C.F. Estrela da Amadora players
C.F. União de Lamas players
Trinidad and Tobago international footballers
1991 CONCACAF Gold Cup players
Trinidad and Tobago expatriate footballers
Expatriate footballers in Jamaica
Expatriate footballers in Portugal
Trinidad and Tobago expatriate sportspeople in Jamaica
Trinidad and Tobago expatriate sportspeople in Portugal
Trinidad and Tobago football managers